Dhanasri is a rāga belonging to the tradition of Odissi music. Falling under the meḷa of the same name, the raga uses komala gandhara and komala nisada swaras and is traditionally associated with the karuṇa rasa. The raga is mentioned in treatises such as the Gita Prakasa and Sangita Narayana.

Structure 
An ancient raga, Dhanasri is accepted as one of the primary melas in Odissi music due to its prominence. It has been used by hundreds of poet-composers for well-over the past many centuries. Its aroha-abaroha are given below :

Aroha : n S g M P n S

Abaroha : S n D P M g R S

Compositions 
Some of the well-known traditional compositions in this raga include :

 Sariba Ki E Nisi Go by Banamali Dasa
 Kanta Bina Diba Rajani by Upendra Bhanja
 Kadamba Bane Bansi Bajila by Gopalakrusna Pattanayaka
 Gostha Chandramanku Asa by Gopalakrusna Pattanayaka
 Ke Ki Kahi Ki Bigidaila by Gopalakrusna Pattanayaka
 Kunchita Nila Kuntala by Benudhara

References 

Ragas of Odissi music